The Amazonas 1600 was a motorcycle made by the Brazilian manufacturer Amazonas, manufactured in Manaus from 1978 to 1988.

Model-specific features
When the importation of foreign motor vehicles into Brazil ceased in 1976, there was a need for nationally produced motorcycles. Since only much smaller motorcycles had been manufactured in Brazil until then, the Amazon was received with enthusiasm. In 1978, the company started producing the Amazonas 1600 in three versions: A civilian, military, and police version.

The massive motorcycle was powered by the Volkswagen Beetle engine, and the disc brake system was also from Volkswagen do Brasil.

Air-cooled four-cylinder boxer engine with a V4 engine was supplied with fuel by two 32 mm Solex carburetor. The displacement was 1584 cc the power output of the civilian version was stated to be up to 54 hp, the police version was said to have reached 68 hp at 4600 min-1.

References 
Notes

Bibliography

External links
 Amazonas

Amazonas 1600
Cruiser motorcycles
Motorcycles introduced in 1978
Motorcycles powered by flat engines
Touring motorcycles